Ras Al Khor Industrial Area is a locality in Dubai, the United Arab Emirates. Literally meaning Cape of the Creek, Ras Al Khor is part of several industrial areas (such as Al Aweer) located in the suburban areas of Dubai.  The Ras Al Khor Industrial Area comprises three sub-localities:
 Ras Al Khor Industrial Area 1
 Ras Al Khor Industrial Area 2
 Ras Al Khor Industrial Area 3

This area has automobile spare parts sales shops, Automobile service centers, Car wash/clinic, and vehicle repair. There are no more business or companies in the Ras Al Khor industrial Areas. All companies are related to the Auto mobile service/clinic/workshop/spare parts. This industrial area has a few warehouses.

See also 
 Arabian Peninsula
 Middle East

References 

Communities in Dubai